The Yusef Abad Synagogue ( Kanise-ye Yusef Ābād) is the main synagogue of Tehran, Iran. It is also one of the largest synagogues of the city. The official name of the Yusef Abad Synagogue is Sukkot Shalom Synagogue. The original building that housed the synagogue was completed in the early 1950s. With the growth of the Jewish population of the capital especially in the Yusef Abad neighborhood, it was decided that a newer building was needed. With the help of local community leaders headed by Avraham Yusian, the construction of the new facade was completed in October 1965. The doors of the new synagogue were opened to the public on Rosh Hashanah 5726 (Hebrew calendar).

On February 8, 2003, President Mohammad Khatami visited Yusef Abad Synagogue becoming the first President of Iran to visit a synagogue since the Islamic Revolution. Chief Rabbi Yousef Hamadani Cohen, Haroun Yashayaei, and Morris Motamed attended and represented the Jewish community of Iran. For the event, Chief Rabbi Yosef Hamadani Cohen led the opening the Torah scroll ark and the reciting of prayers.

Gallery

See also
History of the Jews in Iran
List of synagogues in Iran

References

Further reading

External links
The Center for Research & Analysis of Iranian Jewish History
Negaresh Sevom Iranian Jewish Cultural, Social and Analytical Website (Persian) 

Synagogues in Tehran